The Badminton Competition at the 1999 Pan American Games was held from July 23 to August 8, 1999 in Winnipeg, Manitoba, Canada. There was a total of five events. At the end of the tournament, the host country Canada won three gold medals in the men's, women's and mixed doubles, while the United States captured two golds in the men's and women's singles.

Medal table

Medalists

Participating nations
A total of 13 nations entered players in the badminton competitions, with a total of 62 athletes.

References

External links 
 Tournament result

 
Pan American Games
1999
1999 Pan American Games
Events at the 1999 Pan American Games